The Governorate of Estonia, also known as the Governorate of Esthonia (Pre-reformed ) was a governorate in the Baltic region, along with the Livonian and Courland Governorates. It is a part of the Imperial Russian administration (guberniya), which is located in modern-day northern Estonia and some islands in the West Estonian archipelago, including the islands of Hiiumaa and Vormsi. The Governorate was established in 1796 when Paul I's reform abolished the Viceroyalty (namestnik). Previously, the Reval Governorate existed under Peter I's reign from the Treaty of Nystad, which ceded territory from Sweden to the newly established Russian Empire, until its inexistence in 1783.

From the 1850s until 1914, the Estonian national awakening was influenced and characterized the governorate by general modernization, the reorganization into a modern European society, and the success of the newly emerged nationalist awareness, which realized themselves as Estonians. The accession of Alexander III in 1881 marked the beginning of a period of more rigid Russification. The previous Baltic civil and criminal codes were replaced with Russian ones, and the Russian language replaced the German and Estonian languages. When the Russian Revolution of 1905 spread into Estonia, Jaan Tõnisson founded the National Liberal Party and organized its first congress in Tallinn on 27 November, demanding political autonomy for Estonia. In response, the Russian government suppressed the revolution by declaring martial law. Following that, 328 Estonians were repressed by being shot or hanged, and Konstantin Päts and the radical leader Jaan Teemant fled abroad.

In March 1917, following the February Revolution, the governorate was given northern territory from the Governorate of Livonia and granted autonomy on 12 April 1917, forming the Autonomous Governorate of Estonia. Which lasted for years, until 24 February 1918. When the Committee declared the nation's independence in the city of Pärnu, the governorate was fully abolished.

Until the late 19th century the governorate was administered independently by the local Baltic German nobility through a feudal Regional Council.

History
Initially named the Reval Governorate after the city of Reval (today known as Tallinn), the Governorate originated in 1719 from territories which Russia conquered from Sweden in the course of the Great Northern War of 1700–1721. Sweden formally ceded its former dominion of Swedish Estonia to Russia in the Treaty of Nystad in 1721. During subsequent administrative reordering, the governorate was renamed in 1796 as the Governorate of Estonia. While the rule of the Swedish kings had been fairly liberal with greater autonomy granted for the peasantry, the regime tightened under the Russian tsars and serfdom was not abolished until 1819.

The governorate consisted the northern part of the present-day Estonia, approximately corresponding to: Harju, Lääne-Viru, Ida-Viru, Rapla, Järva, Lääne and Hiiu counties and a small portion of Pärnu County.

After the Russian February Revolution, on  the governorate expanded to include northern Livonia, thereby forming the Autonomous Governorate of Estonia which existed less than a year, until February 1918.

Subdivisions
The governorate was subdivided into uyezds.

Former Subdivisions 
Kreis Baltischport – Baltischport (now Paldiski; 1783–1796)

Leaders of the governorate

1710–1711 Rudolph Felix Bauer – General-Governor
1711–1719 Prince Aleksandr Danilovich Menshikov – General-Governor
1719–1728 Count Fyodor Matveyevich Apraksin – General-Governor
1728–1736 Friedrich Freiherr von Löwen
1736–1738 Ernst Sebastian von Manstein
1738–1740 Gustaf Otto Douglas
1740–1743 Ulrich Friedrich Woldemar Graf von Löwendal
1743–1753 Peter August Friedrich, Duke of Schleswig-Holstein-Sonderburg-Beck (1696–1775)
1753–1758 Prince Vladimir Petrovich Dolgorukiy
1758–1775 Peter August Friedrich, Duke of Schleswig-Holstein-Sonderburg-Beck – General-Governor
1775–1792 Count George Browne – General-Governor
1783–1786 Georg Friedrich von Grotenhielm
1786–1797 Heinrich Johann Freiherr von Wrangell
1797–1808 Andreas von Langell
1808–1809 Duke Peter Friedrich Georg of Oldenburg
1809–1811 vacant
1811–1816 Duke Paul Friedrich August of Oldenburg
1816–1819 Berend Freiherr von Uexküll 
1819–1832 Gotthard Wilhelm Freiherr von Budberg-Bönninghausen
1832–1833 Otto Wilhelm von Essen
1833–1841 Paul Friedrich von Benckendorff 
1842–1859 Johann Christoph Engelbrecht von Grünewaldt
1859–1868 Wilhelm Otto Cornelius Alexander von Ulrich
1868–1870 Mikhail Nikolaiyevich Galkin-Vraskoy
1870–1875 Prince Mikhail Valentinovich Shakhovskoy-Glebov-Strezhnev
1875–1885 Viktor Petrovich Polivanov
1885–1894 Prince Sergey Vladimirovich Shakhovskoy
1894–1902 Yefstafiy Nikolaiyevich Skalon
1902–1905 Aleksey Valerianovich Bellegarde 
16 March 1905 – October 1905 Aleksey Aleksandrovich Lopukhin
1905–1906 Nikolay Georgiyevich von Bünting
1906–1907 Pyotr Petrovich Bashilov
1907–1915 Izmail Vladimirovich Korostovets
1915–1917 Pyotr Vladimirovich Veryovkin

Language
According to the Imperial census of 1897. In bold are languages spoken by more people than the state language.

See also
Administrative divisions of Russia in 1719-1725
History of Estonia – Part of Imperial Russia
Baltic governorates

Footnotes

References

Further reading
 

 
1721 establishments in Russia
Baltic governorates